Sachgan may refer to:
 Sachgan-e Olya